H. carnea may refer to:

 Hydractinia carnea, an athecate hydroid
 Hypocrea carnea, a sac fungus
 Hyposmocoma carnea, a moth endemic to Kauai
 Hypselodoris carnea, a sea slug